Hypatima pentagonia is a moth in the family Gelechiidae. It was described by Kyu-Tek Park and Margarita Gennadievna Ponomarenko in 1999. It is found in Thailand.

The length of the forewings is about 15 mm. The forewings are yellowish white, densely speckled with brown scales and with a small, dark brown, triangular median costal patch, with two yellowish white stripes before it and six similar stripes beyond it along the costa to the apex. The hindwings are grey.

Etymologly
The species name refers to the shape of the abdomen's eighth tergite and is derived from Greek pente (meaning five) and gonia (meaning angle).

References

Hypatima
Moths described in 1999